Hugh III may refer to:

 Hugh III of Lusignan (fl. late 10th century)
 Hugh III of Maine (c. 960–c. 1015)
 Hugh III, Viscount of Châteaudun (died 1044)
 Hugh III de Montfort (died 1123 or after)
 Hugh III of Le Puiset (died 1132)
 Hugh III, Count of Saint-Pol (died 1141)
 Hugh III of Rodez (died 1136)
 Hugh III of Broyes (c. 1120–c. 1199)
 Hugh III, Duke of Burgundy (1142–1192)
 Hugh III of Angoulême (c. 1235/40–1270), a.k.a. Hugh XII of Lusignan
 Hugh III of Cyprus (c. 1235–1284)
 Hugh III of Arborea (died 1383)